Dolichostenomelia is a human condition or habitus in which the limbs are unusually long. The name is derived from Ancient Greek (dolichos - long, steno - short, narrow, close, melia - of the limbs). It is a common feature of several kinds of hereditary disorders which affect connective tissue, such as Marfan syndrome and homocystinuria.


In fiction
The condition is mentioned in the Rizzoli & Isles episode Boston Strangler Redux; Maura Isles (Sasha Alexander) is on a date with a man whom she diagnoses as having Marfan Syndrome, which she says "explains the dolichostenomelia."

See also
 Arachnodactyly

References

Musculoskeletal disorders